The Suntec Singapore Convention and Exhibition Centre, often known simply as Suntec, and previously known as the Singapore International Convention and Exhibition Centre is a convention centre located in the Central Area of Singapore. The building was renovated from October 2012 to June 2013.

Events 
The centre has hosted multiple local and international events. In August 2010, it served as a venue for the Youth Olympic Games, hosting events including Boxing, Fencing, Handball, Judo, Taekwondo and Wrestling. In 2022, the centre hosted The International, an E-sports event, which was co-hosted with the Singapore Indoor Stadium.

The centre has also hosted trade shows and professional conferences, such as the International Dental Exhibition and Meeting, the World Confederation for Physical Therapy Congress, and the IFLA World Library and Information Congress.

References

Buildings and structures in Singapore
Convention centres in Singapore
1995 establishments in Singapore